CSP Music Group is an entertainment firm headquartered in Atlanta, Georgia with offices in Minneapolis and Las Vegas.

Founded in 1999, the company signed, produced, engineered, managed, and promoted music for artists including Boyz II Men, Chris Brown, Jhené Aiko, Amanda Cole, J-Kwon, Jennifer Lopez, Damita Chandler, Christina Aguilera, Dawn Richard, Karlie Redd, Gospel star Emcee N.I.C.E. featuring Fred Hammond, and 2021 American Idol contestants siblings Ammon and Liahona Olayan.

History  
CSP Music Group was founded in 1999 as Starrtraxx Music Productions by Christopher Starr. Starr along with his team went on to establish their early beginnings with B-Rich Productions and Baby Honey Records. He started CSP Music Group, initially as a music production company that produced, engineered, and composed music for the prominent artists including singer Christina Aguilera, D. Woods of Danity Kane, LaTocha Scott of Xscape, Damita Haddon, Mary J. Blige and others. The company opened an Atlanta, GA office at the beginning of 2014 and moved the base of their operation. Starr focused on offering affordable industry services with his team of industry professionals.

In 2013, the company was launched as CSP Music Group, a full-service independent record label and subsequently added management, legal, marketing and consulting services as well.

CSP Music Group's team has gained recent credits with charting number 1 on Billboard and Digital Radio Tracker. In 2021, American Idol contestants, Ammon and Liahona Olayan, achieved over 1.4 million views of their performances. CSP client such as Emcee N.I.C.E. also charted number 1 on Billboard for his songs titled I got Angels and Glory To God as an independent artist.

Mason J Records 
Starr founded Mason J Records, an independent label and as a subsidiary label of the CSP Music Group to work with creative artists.

References

External links 
 Official website

Companies based in Atlanta
American record labels